State Route 96 (SR 96) is a state highway in the U.S. state of California that follows the Trinity and Klamath Rivers between State Route 299 in Willow Creek and Interstate 5 near Yreka in Northern California. For most of the route it goes through the Karuk Tribal Reservation, the Yurok Tribal Reservation, and the Hoopa Tribal Reservation. Over half of the length is the Bigfoot Scenic Byway, passing through "the region boasting the most sightings of Bigfoot of anywhere in the country" according to the National Forest Scenic Byway Program.

Route description 
The route begins at a junction with State Route 299, the Trinity Highway, in Willow Creek. It heads north, following the Trinity River downstream through  Hoopa, and exiting the Trinity National Forest near its confluence with the Klamath River at Weitchpec. At Weitchpec, the route intersects State Route 169 and turns northeast into the Six Rivers National Forest. The highway passes through Orleans and turns more northerly after intersecting Salmon River Road. Passing through Happy Camp, SR 96 enters the Klamath National Forest. After passing through Gottsville, the route exits the national forest. It intersects State Route 263, which heads south toward Yreka. SR 96 then turns north. Passing the Randolf Collier Safety Roadside Rest Area, the route meets its terminus at Interstate 5.

SR 96 is not part of the National Highway System, a network of highways that are considered essential to the country's economy, defense, and mobility by the Federal Highway Administration. SR 96 is eligible for the State Scenic Highway System, but it is not officially designated as a scenic highway by the California Department of Transportation.

The segment of SR 96 from Willow Creek to Happy Camp is designated as the Bigfoot Scenic Byway, a National Forest Scenic Byway that goes through a region boasting the most sightings of Bigfoot in the United States.

Major intersections

See also

References

External links

California @ AARoads.com - State Route 96
Caltrans: Route 96 highway conditions
California Highways: SR 96

096
State Route 096
State Route 096